The 1982–83 season was the 59th season in the existence of AEK Athens F.C. and the 24th consecutive season in the top flight of Greek football. They competed in the Alpha Ethniki, the Greek Cup and the UEFA Cup. The season began on 19 September 1982 and finished on 29 June 1983.

Overview

In the summer of 1982, Andreas Zafiropoulos stepped out of the presidency of AEK Athens due to the "displeasure" of the fans. He retained the team's shares, but handed over the management of the team to the shipowner Michalis Arkadis. Arkadis was for years the right hand of Loukas Barlos, while apart from president, he also served as vice president and general manager of the team. Takis Nikoloudis returned to the team after his passing from Olympiacos, while AEK also proceeded with the transfer of the goalkeeper Christos Arvanitis. Hristo Bonev left the team and returned to Lokomotiv Plovdiv. Zlatko Čajkovski remained on the bench, thus "cashing in" the good finish of the previous season, which found AEK qualified in the UEFA Cup.

After an absence of two years, AEK  participated in the UEFA Cup, but they had a bad draw facing the mighty Köln of the great Rinus Michels, which was last year's runner-up in Germany with players in the likes of Littbarski, Fischer, Alofs, Steiner and Schumacher. Thus, AEK's task was by definition very difficult. The first match took place at 14 September, however, it was not to be completed due to the large fire at Tatoi and the inevitable power outage of the stadium at the 88th minute without AEK being responsible. In the game, AEK were ahead from early on, however, trapped in the slow pace of the Germans, the tie of the match was turned by the 33rd minute with AEK managing to equalize at the end of half time. In the second half, AEK increased their offensive pace and made the score 3–2, but almost immediately were equalized. As game progressed AEK were pushing on, until in the 88th minute the current voltage subsided and the stadium sunk into darkness. The match was stopped, mini-meetings followed and the referee, denied the solution of ending of the match at this point. The suspension of the was decided and the game was scheduled to be repeated two weeks later, on 28 September. The coaches changed their tactics based on the conclusions from the first match. The match went with AEK having the initiative of the moves, however the goal conceded in the 58th minute and the fatigue of the players, led it to the defeat which made the qualification even harder. The things got even worse as they presented an extremely bad image, as the players could not even hold the ball on their feet. As if this were not enough, Mavros also missed a penalty when the score was at 4–0, in an opportunity to reduce the extent of the score. On the other hand, the Germans presented a fast-moving team and did whatever they wanted throughout the game scoring 5 goals, while losing opportunities for even more, but  they did not succeed thanks to the decent performance of Arvanitis. The 6,000 Greeks were present at the stadium, expressed their dissatisfaction with the overall image of the team and left extremely disappointed.

Even though the championship started with a defeat by Ethnikos Piraeus, the team continued well. As time progressed, the relations of some players with the coach, as well as the concerns of the management of the club about the physical condition of the players, caused controversy in the face of the coach. The culmination of all this was the home game of the 13th game against OFI. AEK were leading by 2–0 and eventually were defeated by 2–3, which resulted in the dismissal of Čajkovski. The decision to expel the Croatian coach was opposed by the vast majority of the fans of the club, as until that moment AEK were in the race for the championship, just 1 point behind the first Olympiacos. The technical leadership of AEK was taken over temporarily for the next five games by Kostas Nestoridis. From the 19th game on the bench of AEK, the well-known from his term at Panathinaikos and Olympiacos, Helmut Senekowitsch was hired. The changes of coaches also greatly affected the course of the team. The team finished in the 3rd place, equaling with AEL and 5 points behind the Olympiacos. Thomas Mavros emerged as the club's top scorer in the league with 19 goals.

AEK completed the season with the conquest of the Greek Cup, eliminating Olympiacos in the quarter-finals with 2 wins and defeating PAOK by 2–0 at the Olympic Stadium in the final that was marked by crowd incidents.

Players

Squad information

NOTE: The players are the ones that have been announced by the AEK Athens' press release. No edits should be made unless a player arrival or exit is announced. Updated 30 June 1983, 23:59 UTC+3.

Transfers

In

Summer

Winter

Out

Summer

Overall transfer activity

Expenditure
Summer:  ₯0

Winter:  ₯0

Total:  ₯0

Income
Summer:  ₯0

Winter:  ₯0

Total:  ₯0

Net Totals
Summer:  ₯0

Winter:  ₯0

Total:  ₯0

Pre-season and friendlies

Alpha Ethniki

League table

Results summary

Results by Matchday

Fixtures

Greek Cup

Matches

Round of 16

Quarter-finals

Semi-finals

Final

UEFA Cup

First round

Statistics

Squad statistics

! colspan="11" style="background:#FFDE00; text-align:center" | Goalkeepers
|-

! colspan="11" style="background:#FFDE00; color:black; text-align:center;"| Defenders
|-

! colspan="11" style="background:#FFDE00; color:black; text-align:center;"| Midfielders
|-

! colspan="11" style="background:#FFDE00; color:black; text-align:center;"| Forwards
|-

|}

Disciplinary record

|-
! colspan="17" style="background:#FFDE00; text-align:center" | Goalkeepers

|-
! colspan="17" style="background:#FFDE00; color:black; text-align:center;"| Defenders

|-
! colspan="17" style="background:#FFDE00; color:black; text-align:center;"| Midfielders

|-
! colspan="17" style="background:#FFDE00; color:black; text-align:center;"| Forwards

|}

References

External links
AEK Athens F.C. Official Website

AEK Athens F.C. seasons
AEK Athens